Louis J. Marotti (1915-2003) was a professional football player in the National Football League. He played in the league from 1943 to 1945. He played for the Chicago Cardinals and "Card-Pitt", a team that was the result of a temporary merger between the Pittsburgh Steelers and the Cardinals. The teams' merger was a result of the manning shortages experienced league-wide due to World War II.

References

1915 births
People from Chisholm, Minnesota
Players of American football from Minnesota
Chicago Cardinals players
Card-Pitt players
Toledo Rockets football players
2003 deaths